The Boundary Treaty of 1970 is a treaty between the United States and Mexico that settled all outstanding boundary disputes and uncertainties related to the Rio Grande (Río Bravo del Norte) border between them. 

The most significant dispute remaining after the Chamizal Settlement in 1963 involved the location of the boundary in the area of Presidio, Texas, and Ojinaga, Chihuahua. The river channel was relocated to approximate conditions existing prior to the dispute that arose from changes in the course of the river in 1907. The International Boundary and Water Commission was charged with its implementation. The American-Mexican Treaty Act of October 25, 1972 authorized participation by the United States IBWC section. The project commenced in 1975 and completed in 1977.

Provisions
It is an earth channel with dimensions patterned after the natural channel. The United States acquired  of American agricultural land that was used for the transfer of lands to Mexico and for half of the river relocation.

Also, the channel of the Rio Grande in the Hidalgo–Reynosa area was relocated to transfer from Mexico to the United States  by constructing a new  earth channel. This transfer was made in exchange for the transfer from the United States to Mexico of two tracts of land, the Horcón Tract, after 1906 located south of the Rio Grande, and Beaver Island (La Isla de Morteritos), located in the river south of Roma, Texas, comprising  in total. This provision transferred to Mexico the portion of the town of Río Rico, Tamaulipas, located within the Horcón Tract.

The cost of the two relocations was shared equally by the two governments, with the United States performing the greater part of the work required in the Presidio-Ojinaga area, and Mexico performing the work required in the Hidalgo-Reynosa area and a small part of the work required in the Presidio-Ojinaga area.

See also
 Rio Grande border disputes
 United States territorial acquisitions
 Mexico–United States border

References

Sources

1970 in Mexico
International territorial disputes of the United States
Territorial disputes of Mexico
Texas border disputes
Boundary treaties
Mexico–United States border
Mexico–United States treaties
Treaties concluded in 1970
Treaties entered into force in 1972